Helen Dean King (September 27, 1869 – March 7, 1955) was an American biologist. She was involved in breeding the Wistar lab rat, a strain of rats genetically homogeneous albinos intended for use in biological and medical research.

Life and work 
Born at Owego, New York, she graduated from Vassar College in 1892, and in 1899 she received her doctorate in philosophy from Bryn Mawr College, with a thesis supervised by embryologist and geneticist Thomas Hunt Morgan. She had majored in morphology. She remained at the College after graduation as a fellow and student assistant in biology from 1897 to 1904.

King taught physiology at Miss Baldwin's School, Bryn Mawr, from 1899 to 1907, was research fellow at the University of Pennsylvania in 1906–08, and served as an assistant in anatomy in 1908-09. After 1909, she worked at the Wistar Institute, for more than 40 years, first as an assistant and eventually becoming professor of embryology in 1927 and remaining there until her retirement in 1949.

She was also an assistant at Woods Hole, Massachusetts. Her investigations dealt largely with problems of sex determination.

King served as vice president of the American Society of Zoologists in 1937, and was associate editor of the Journal of Morphology and Physiology from 1924 to 1927 and editor of the Wistar Institute's bibliography service from 1922 to 1935.

King participated in breeding the Wistar rat, a strain of genetically homogeneous albino rats for use in biological and medical research.

She died at age 85 on March 7, 1955, in Philadelphia, Pennsylvania.

Research 
King's scientific research largely focused on studies of inbred rats, and she was particularly interested in human issues while using for this purpose data from meticulous experiments on laboratory rats. Through inbreeding, her rats were almost homozygous to each other, which facilitated research. In later years, she moved her focus to pursue research on gray Norway rats.

Awards 

 Ellen Richards Research Prize of the Association to Aid Scientific Research for Women (1932)

Selected publications 

 King, Helen Dean. "On the weight of the albino rat at birth and the factors that influence it." The Anatomical Record 9, no. 3 (1915): 213-231.
 King, Helen Dean. "Studies on inbreeding. I. The effects in inbreeding on the growth and variability in the body weight of the albino rat." Journal of Experimental Zoology 26, no. 1 (1918): 1-54.
 King, Helen Dean, and Henry Herbert Donaldson. "Life processes and size of the body and organs of the gray Norway rat during ten generations in captivity." American Anatomical Memoirs (1929).
 King, Helen Dean. "Life processes in gray Norway rats during fourteen years in captivity." American Anatomical Memoirs (1939).

References

External links
 
 

Vassar College alumni
1869 births
1955 deaths
University of Pennsylvania faculty
University of Pennsylvania Department of Biology faculty
20th-century American scientists
People from Owego, New York
American women biologists
American physiologists
Women physiologists
Bryn Mawr College alumni
Scientists from New York (state)
American women academics
20th-century American women scientists